Einar Wilhelm Juva (7 January 1892 – 6 September 1966) was a Finnish historian, professor at Turku University 1920–1955.  His surname until 1935 was Juvelius. He was born in Raahe.

He mainly outlined Finland's military and geopolitical position in the Swedish empire in the 18th century. He wrote also a survey in 10 parts on Finland's history: Suomen Kansan aikakirjat (1927–38), in which he popularised the results of the historical research. The work should be regarded as a Finnish counterpart to the works of the Swedish historian Carl Grimberg. Juva also wrote a biography of P. E. Svinhufvud and Rudolf Walden.

He served as rector of the University of Turku from 1934 to 1945. He died in Turku, aged 74.

Together with his son Mikko Juva he wrote  (5 parts, 1964–67).

Bibliography
  (10 vols., 1927–38)
  (1920)
  (5 vols., 1964–1967, with Mikko Juva)
  (1947)
 Rudolf Walden (1957)
 P. E. Svinhufvud (2 vols., 1957–61)

References

1892 births
1966 deaths
People from Raahe
People from Oulu Province (Grand Duchy of Finland)
20th-century Finnish historians
Academic staff of the University of Turku
Rectors of the University of Turku